Oksapmin is a Trans–New Guinea language spoken in Oksapmin Rural LLG, Telefomin District, Sandaun, Papua New Guinea. 
The two principal dialects are distinct enough to cause some problems with mutual intelligibility.

Oksapmin has dyadic kinship terms and a body-part counting system that goes up to 27.

Classification
Oksapmin has been influenced by the Mountain Ok languages (the name "Oksapmin" is from Telefol), and the similarities with those languages were attributed to borrowing in the classifications of both Stephen Wurm (1975) and Malcolm Ross (2005), where Oksapmin was placed as an independent branch of Trans–New Guinea. Loughnane (2009) and Loughnane and Fedden (2011) conclude that it is related to the Ok languages, though those languages share innovative features not found in Oksapmin. Usher finds Oksapmin is not related to the Ok languages specifically, though it is related at some level to the southwestern branches of Trans–New Guinea.

Phonology

Vowels
There are six monophthongs, and one diphthong, .

Consonants

Tone
Oksapmin contrasts two tones: high and low.

References

External links 
 Timothy Usher, New Guinea World, Oksap

Languages of Sandaun Province
Languages of Southern Highlands Province
Languages of Western Province (Papua New Guinea)
Ok languages
Trans–New Guinea languages